Hypotacha legrandi is a species of moth in the family Erebidae. It is found in Eritrea, Ethiopia, Kenya, Tanzania and Yemen.

References

Moths described in 1959
Hypotacha
Moths of Africa